Sigrid Quack (born 17 July 1958) is a German social scientist working in the field of comparative sociology. She is a professor of sociology at the University of Duisburg-Essen in Germany, where she is the Director of the Centre for Global Cooperation Research, and was a senior fellow at the Watson Institute for International Studies, Brown University.

Biography
Quack studied sociology in Paris and Berlin. Her doctorate was awarded by the Free University of Berlin in 1992 on the topic of dynamics of part-time work, and she subsequently worked at the Wissenschaftszentrum Berlin für Sozialforschung. In 2007, she received her habilitation for scholarship on cross-border institutional development, and became a professor at the University of Cologne based at the Max Planck Institute for the Study of Societies from 2007 until 2013.

Research

Quack is the head of an international research group on transnational institution-building. Her work has examined the phenomenon of transnationality and governance, with a focus on how global governance institutions increasingly interact with politics and practices on the ground. In particular, she has studied governance across borders in the fields of copyright and open access, financial reporting, the regulation of multinational companies, environmentalism, and labor rights. She is the author or editor of numerous books and articles on globalization, institutions and regulation.

In 2020 and 2021, Quack was President of the Society for the Advancement of Socio-Economics, a key international scholarly society in the field of economic sociology.

References

External links
Blog Governance Across Borders
Sigrid Quack page on AcademiaNet

1958 births
Living people
German sociologists
German women sociologists
20th-century German writers
20th-century German women writers
21st-century German writers
21st-century German women writers
Brown University fellows
Free University of Berlin alumni
Academic staff of the University of Cologne
Academic staff of the University of Duisburg-Essen